DD Chandana is a Kannada  TV channel owned and operated by Prasar Bharati under Doordarshan, supported by Doordarshan studios in Bengaluru and Kalburgi.  Launched in 1994 DD Chandana has entertainment serials, infotainment programmes, news and current affairs, social programmes and film programmes as its major content. In terrestrial mode, DD Chandana is available to 81.7% of the population of Karnataka. DD Chandana TV channel also available on DD Free dish DTH, at channel number 86. 

Chandana in Sanskrit and kannada means sandalwood.

History

A regional language satellite channel was launched on 15 August 1991, which became 24 hrs channel on 1 January 2000. This channel was commonly known as DD-9 Kannada which came to be later on christened as "Chandana",on April 5, 2000 which true to its name has been the true cultural ambassador of the State. It is the Kannada language satellite channel supported by Doordarshan studios in Bengaluru and Kalaburgi. It has entertainment serials, infotainment programmes, news & current affairs, social programmes and film programmes as its major content. In terrestrial mode, DD Chandana is available to 81.7% of the population of Karnataka. Today Doordarshan Bangalore covers an area of 76.2% and population of 82.4%.

DD Chandana has also telecasted programmes on promotion of fire safety at home work place, industry and at community level. Some of the past programs were: Agni Sanchike weekly T.V. serial programme and Fire Warden Organization, to provide an opportunity to volunteers to join hands with the Fire Services in improving fire safety awareness and quick reaction habits in the community. Chandana channel also telecasted 20 commissioned programs, documentaries and software such as drama, telefilms and serials during the year 2004.

List of programmes
The channel has given the audience a number of memorable programmes of which most popular being
 Dance Samara- Dance reality show
Gana Chandana - Singing reality show
 Varthegalu (meaning: News) - News program
 Chitramanjari (meaning: Picture snow) - Program on Kannada film songs
 Thatt Antha Heli (meaning: Answer in a flash) - Quiz program
 Suththona Namma Nadu (meaning: Lets travel our place) - A program on Karnataka state travel guide
 Kathaa Saritha/Maalike/ (meaning: Story garland) - A showcase of numerous short stories of Kannada literature
 Karnataka Shasthreeya Sangeetha (meaning: Classical music) - Musical program
 Belagu (meaning: Lighten) - Interview program of any renowned Guest
 Chalanchitra (meaning: Movie)

Technology

See also
 List of programs broadcast by DD National
 All India Radio
 Ministry of Information and Broadcasting
 DD Direct Plus
 List of South Asian television channels by country

References

External links 
 Doordarshan Official Internet site
 Doordarshan news site
 An article at PFC

 

Kannada-language television channels
Doordarshan
Foreign television channels broadcasting in the United Kingdom
Television channels and stations established in 1994
Direct broadcast satellite services
Indian direct broadcast satellite services
1994 establishments in Karnataka
Television stations in Bangalore